Chara Papadopoulou (born December 9, 1996 in Athens, Greece) is a female professional volleyball player from Greece, who is a member of the Greece women's national volleyball team. At club level, she plays for Austrian club ATSC Kelag Wildcats.

Sporting achievements

Clubs

International competitions
 2017/2018 : CEV Women's Challenge Cup, with Olympiacos S.F. Piraeus

National championships
 2017/2018  Hellenic Championship, with Olympiacos Piraeus

National cups
 2017/2018  Hellenic Cup, with Olympiacos Piraeus

References

External links
 Chara Papadopoulou - Personal info at greekvolley.gr 
 profile at CEV web site  at cev.eu
 2017: Papadopoulou signs in Olympiacos Piraeus www.olympiacossfp.gr 
 Chara Papadopoulou: Personal info - Titles - Clubs volleybox.net

Greek women's volleyball players
Panathinaikos Women's Volleyball players
Olympiacos Women's Volleyball players
1996 births
Living people
Volleyball players from Athens
21st-century Greek women